Shin Kwangho is a South Korean painter currently based in Seoul. He studied art at Keimyung University. He paints distorted portraits, which he creates using oil, acrylic, and charcoal.

Shin's paintings depict subjects using colors that represent the subjects' emotions, with brushstrokes and layers of paint often distorting the subjects' faces while drawing attention to the eyes.

References

Living people
South Korean painters
1983 births